Pinax may refer to:

Pinax, a votive tablet that served as a votive object deposited in a sanctuary or burial chamber
Pinakes, a 3rd-century-BCE work by Callimachus, the first library catalog system
Pinax (software)